Ronald Nathan LaTour Jr. (born September 24, 1984), professionally known as Cardo Got Wings or simply Cardo, is an American record producer and rapper.

Early life and career 
Cardo was born and raised in St. Paul, Minnesota. He then moved to Fort Worth, Texas.

In 2010, Cardo was producing for Mac Miller and Chevy Woods and subsequently met Wiz Khalifa at a show in Texas through Chevy Woods and his Uncle Motor. Cardo gave Khalifa a couple of his beats, which would end up on Khalifa's Kush & Orange Juice mixtape. Cardo then started producing for other artists.

Cardo is the founder and CEO of the record label Everything is Gold Music (EISG). Cardo was previously a member of, and producer on, Taylor Gang Records, and currently signed to Fool's Gold Records. He has produced on many rappers albums and singles including Curren$y, 2 Chainz, Drake, Skepta, Kendrick Lamar, Travi$ Scott, ScHoolboy Q, Meek Mill, The Game, Wiz Khalifa, R. Kelly, Jeezy, Jay Z, Frank Dukes and Swizz Beatz, among others. In June 2022, he signed Atlanta rapper YoDogg to EISG, in a joint venture with Epic Records.

On December 21, 2017, Cardo and Payroll Giovanni of Detroit-based Doughboyz Cashout announced their record deal with Def Jam Records.

Cardo's professional name was derived from relatives who named him 'Ricardo' the Puerto Rican, despite being fully aware of his Caucasian and African American descent.

Discography

Studio albums

Collaborative albums

Production discography

Songs produced

Production credits

References

External links 
 

Southern hip hop musicians
American hip hop record producers
Songwriters from Texas
Musicians from Dallas
Living people
People from Fort Worth, Texas
Musicians from Saint Paul, Minnesota
Songwriters from Minnesota
1984 births
Businesspeople from Saint Paul, Minnesota
Record producers from Texas